Andrea Gasbarro (born 7 January 1995) is an Italian footballer who plays as a defender for  club Padova.

Club career
On 31 January 2020, he joined Pordenone on loan until June 2020 with an option to purchase.

On 25 September 2020, he signed with Padova.

References

External links

1995 births
Living people
Sportspeople from Pisa
Italian footballers
Association football defenders
Serie B players
Serie C players
U.S. Livorno 1915 players
U.S. Città di Pontedera players
Pordenone Calcio players
Calcio Padova players
Italy youth international footballers
Footballers from Tuscany